National Skate Patrol (NSP) is a volunteer service organization created in New York City in 1992 in order to help roller skaters better interact with the larger public. NSP instructs inline skaters on basic technique, safety equipment, and etiquette.

History
NSP was created in 1992 by members of the New York Road Skaters Association and the IISA (International Inline Skating Association).  They quickly expanded and there are currently 10 NSP chapters.

Start and Stop Clinics
NSP volunteers teach new skaters and those who have problems using their heel brakes how to stop. Many clubs also teach basic techniques including how to properly use safety equipment.

Chapters 
National Skate Patrol is a member-based organization, with individuals located across the country. 
NSP has chapters in the following metropolitan areas:

Atlanta
Boston
Central Park (New York)
Chicago
Dallas
Detroit
Nashua, New Hampshire
Pittsburgh
South Beach (Miami Beach, Florida)
South Florida (Boca Raton, Florida)
Washington, D.C.

Contact information for these NSP Chapters is available on the National Skate Patrol website.

Joining NSP
NSP patrollers must be proficient inline skaters who are able to teach basic forward motion and proper use of the heel brake.  All patrollers must pass a basic certification test that includes both written questions and a hands-on teaching evaluation.  Anyone interested in becoming an NSP patroller can contact a local chapter for more information.

Though all NSP patrollers are volunteers, each must pay nominal annual dues ($36) and are strongly encouraged to commit regular time to local chapter events.  These may include stopping clinics, patrolling and/or other chapter events that support inline skating and skate safety.  Membership renewal is year round on the website.

All NSP patrollers MUST wear helmets and wrist guards whenever on skates as an NSP patroller.  Knee and elbow pads are optional but highly recommended.

References

Roller skating in the United States
Roller skating equipment